Hippuriphila modeeri is a species of flea beetle in the family Chrysomelidae, found in both the Nearctic and Palearctic.

References

Beetles described in 1761
Alticini
Taxa named by Carl Linnaeus